Route 147 is a short highway in Lincoln County.  Its northern terminus is in Cuivre River State Park; its southern terminus is at Route 47 east of Troy.

Route description
Route 147 begins at an intersection with Route 47 east of Troy, heading north as a two-lane undivided road. The route heads into forested areas of Cuivre River State Park, curving to the northwest. The road heads to the west and winds through more of the state park. Route 147 comes to its northern terminus at an intersection with Frenchman Bluff Road, where the road continues west as Park Road.

Major intersections

References

147
Transportation in Lincoln County, Missouri